Panikos Hatziloizou (born 30 September 1959) is a Cypriot former professional footballer who played as a midfielder.

Club career
Hatziloizou started football at Aris Limassol in 1974 as a teenager and he impressed with the fluency he showed in scoring and in general with his attacking skills. People who were researching the Cypriot market of footballers on behalf of AEK Athens and who belonged mainly to the environment of the Cypriot shipowner, Vasos Chatziioannou, a close associate Loukas Barlos in the administration of the AEK, spotted Hatziloizou and in 1977, at the age of 18, they brought him in Nea Filadelfeia for a try out. Even though the manager of the club, František Fadrhonc spoke flatteringly of his worth, the young Hatziloizou, after the try out with the AEK, returned to Cyprus to serve his military service. When it was nearing completion, the people watching him brought him back to Athens in mid-August 1979 and Hatziloizou was placed under the protection of Nikos Stratos while he trained daily under the supervision of Fadrhonc. A week later, the president of Aris Limassol, Alekos Prattis, arrived in Athens and on 16 August 1979, the transfer of Hatziloizou to AEK was completed in the office of Barlos, with AEK paying the sum of 3,000,000 drachmas.

AEK at the time was filled with a many stars and the competition for a place in the main squad was very tough. Despite some good performances in friendly matches, Hatziloizou did not manage to establish himself in the team and combined with the misfortune of some minor injuries, at the end of the season he left the yellow-blacks. Hatziloizou then returned to Cyprus and Aris Limassol, where he was the emerged as the top scorer of the Cypriot First Division in 1983 with 17 goals. At the beginning of the season he almost created a feud between his club and APOEL, when he signed a transfer form twice and withdrew it. He played at Aris until 1991. The last stop of his career was Apollon Limassol, where he played from 1993 to 1995 winning the league in 1994.

International career
Hatziloizou having been international with all the departments, he played with Cyprus and made 7 appearances, which was an important number, at a time when the competition was very intense with the clubs of Nicosia, mainly, having several players in the starting eleventh the team.

After football
After his retirement from as a footballer, Hatziloizou became involved in coaching, collaborating in various coaching positions with Aris Limassol, most recently as the head of the team's academies.

Honours

Apollon Limassol
Cypriot First Division: 1993–94

Individual
Cypriot First Division top scorer: 1982–83

References

External links

1959 births
Living people
Cypriot footballers
Aris Limassol FC players
AEK Athens F.C. players
Apollon Limassol FC players
Association football midfielders
Cypriot First Division players
Cyprus international footballers
Cypriot football managers
Aris Limassol FC managers